A number of orcas, also called killer whales, are held in captivity by humans for breeding or performance purposes. The practice of capturing and displaying orcas in exhibitions began in the 1960s, and they soon became popular attractions at public aquariums and aquatic theme parks due to their intelligence, trainability, striking appearance, playfulness, and sheer size. As of January 9, 2023, there were 55 orcas in captivity worldwide, 29 of which were captive-born. At that time, there were 18 orcas in the SeaWorld parks.

The practice of keeping orcas in captivity is controversial, due to the separation from their familial pod during capture, and their living conditions and health in captivity. Additionally, concerns have been raised regarding the safety of animal trainers entering the water to work with captive orcas, which have been responsible for numerous attacks on humans—some fatal. Attacks on humans by wild orcas are rare, and no fatal ones have been reported.

Orcas

Orcas are large, active and intelligent. The orca is the largest species of the dolphin family. The species is found in all the world's oceans, from the frigid Arctic and Antarctic regions to warm, tropical seas. Orcas are intelligent, versatile and opportunistic predators. Some populations feed entirely on fish, while other populations hunt marine mammals, including sea lions, elephant seals, seals, walruses, porpoises, dolphins, large whales and some species of shark including great whites. The species is an apex predator, as no other animal predates on orcas. There are up to five distinct orca types, some of which may be separate races, subspecies or even species. Orcas are highly social, and some populations are composed of matrilineal family groups that are the most stable of any animal species. The sophisticated social behavior, hunting techniques, and vocal behavior of orcas have been described as manifestations of animal culture.

Although the orca is not an endangered species, some populations are threatened or endangered due to bioaccumulation of persistent organic pollutants, depletion of prey populations, captures for marine mammal parks, conflicts with fishing activities, acoustic pollution, shipping vessels, stress from whale-watching boats, and habitat loss.

Capture and breeding
It is extremely difficult to capture orcas and to provide a healthy environment for the captives. Early attempts in the 1960s caused many injuries and deaths. However, with experience, the teams who specialized in the business became more adept and post-capture survival rates improved. Live captures peaked in the early 1970s, but have become increasingly rare as the marine parks have learned how to maintain theme park populations through captive breeding and artificial insemination.

North Eastern Pacific captures

The first capture in the North Eastern Pacific occurred in November 1961. An orca of the Pacific offshore ecotype, suspected to be ailing by Marineland of the Pacific officials, was netted by its collecting crew when swimming alone near Newport Beach, California. They took the  orca to a tank at the aquarium. She became known as Wanda, but convulsed and died two days later after "swimming at high speed around the tank, striking her body repeatedly", recalled Marineland's Frank Brocato. The next orca captured, Moby Doll, was harpooned in 1964 but survived for nearly three months in captivity when taken to Vancouver, British Columbia, by the Vancouver Aquarium. He was a member of J Pod of the Southern Resident Killer Whales, the population of killer whales most damaged by subsequent captures. The third capture for display occurred in June 1965 when William Lechkobit found a 22-foot (6.7 m) male orca in his floating salmon net that had drifted close to shore near Namu, British Columbia. The killer whale was sold for $8,000 to Ted Griffin, a Seattle public aquarium owner. Named after his place of capture, Namu was the subject of a film that changed some people's attitudes toward orcas.

In October 1965, Shamu, a very young, 14 foot (4.25 m), 2000 lb (900 kg) Southern Resident orca was captured by Ted Griffin off Penn Cove, Puget Sound, Washington to be a companion for the orca Namu at Griffin's Seattle public aquarium. Her name means 'Friend of Namu' (alternately 'She-Namu'). However, Shamu did not get along with Namu and so was sold to SeaWorld in San Diego in December 1965.

The Yukon Harbor capture operation realized the planned, deliberate capture of multiple orcas for the first time. After a long and dramatic, 17-day operation in February and March 1967, five southern resident orcas were taken into captivity, while three others died entangled in nets.

During the 1960s and early 1970s, nearly 50 orcas were taken from Pacific waters for exhibition. The Southern Resident community of orcas in the Northeast Pacific lost 48 of its members to captivity. By 1976, only 80 orcas were left in the community, which remains endangered. With subsequent captures, the theme parks learned more about avoiding injury during capture and subsequent care of orcas, and discovered that they could be trained to perform tricks, making them a great attraction to visitors. As commercial demand increased, growing numbers of Pacific orcas were captured, peaking in 1970.

A turning point came with a mass capture of orcas from the L-25 pod on  August 8, 1970 at Penn Cove in Puget Sound off the coast of Washington. The Penn Cove capture became controversial due to the large number of wild orcas that were taken (seven) and the number of deaths that resulted: four juveniles died, as well as one adult female who drowned when she became tangled in a net while attempting to reach her calf. In his interview for the CNN documentary Blackfish, former diver John Crowe told how all five of the orcas had their abdomen slit open and filled with rocks, their tails weighted down with anchors and chains, in an attempt to conceal the deaths.  The facts surrounding their deaths were discovered three months later after three of the dead whales washed ashore on Whidbey Island. Public concern about the welfare of the animals and the effect of captures on the wild pods led to the Marine Mammal Protection Act being passed in 1972 by the US Congress, protecting orcas from being harassed or killed, and requiring special permits for capture. Since then, few wild orcas have been captured in Northeastern Pacific waters.

Lolita, originally known as Tokitae, was a survivor of the Penn Cove captures. She was about four years old at time of capture and is now the second oldest captive orca. Lolita is the subject of the documentary Lolita: Slave to Entertainment, released in 2008. Various groups still argue that Lolita should be released into the wild. Lolita's mother, L-25 (also known as Ocean Sun), is still alive at approximately 90 years old and is the oldest living southern resident orca in the wild.

Icelandic captures

When the US Marine Mammal Protection Act of 1972 effectively stopped the capture of Pacific orcas, exhibitors found an area more tolerant of killer whale captures in Iceland. Icelandic herring fishermen had traditionally seen Orcas as competitors for their catch, and sale of live killer whales promised a large new source of income. 48 live Orcas captured in Icelandic waters were exported to marine parks between 1976 and 1988. The capture process was based on luring the orcas by dumping leftovers from herring fishing in front of the pod, capturing the Orcas in a purse seine net, selecting desirable animals and hauling them on board in a specially designed frame, then placing them in foam-lined boxes full of seawater. However, restrictions on US Orca import permits and advances in captive breeding programs meant that the market never became as large as expected. Growing concern from conservationists and animal rights activists has caused the Icelandic government to limit the number of orcas that may be captured each year.

The Icelandic captives included Keiko, caught in 1979 and sold to the Icelandic aquarium in Hafnarfjörður. Three years later, he was sold to Marineland of Canada, where he first started performing for the public and developed skin lesions indicative of poor health. He was then sold to Reino Aventura (now named Six Flags Mexico), an amusement park in Mexico City, in 1985. He was the star of the 1993 movie Free Willy, the publicity from which led to an effort by Warner Brothers Studio to find him a better home. Using donations from the studio, Craig McCaw the Oregon Coast Aquarium in Newport, Oregon spent over $7 million to construct facilities to return him to health with the hope of returning him to the wild. He was airlifted to his new home in January 1996, where he soon regained weight. In September 1998, he was flown to Klettsvik Bay in Vestmannaeyjar in Iceland, and gradually reintroduced to the wild, returning to the open sea on July 11, 2002. Keiko died from pneumonia on December 12, 2003, at the age of 27 years. He had become lethargic and had a loss of appetite.

North Western Pacific captures
1,477 killer whales were hunted in Japanese waters between 1948 and 1972, 545 of them around Hokkaido. Killer whale encounters in Japanese waters are now rare. In 1997 a group of ten killer whales was corralled by Japanese fisherman banging on iron rods and using water bombs to disorient the animals and force them into a bay near Taiji, Wakayama, a technique known as dolphin drive hunting which these villagers have been practising for years. The orcas were held in the bay for two days before being auctioned to Japanese marine parks. Five animals were released, and the other five transported via road or sea to the aquariums. All five are now dead.

The first live killer whale captured in Russia was an -long female estimated to be about six years old, captured off the Pacific coast of the Kamchatka district on September 26, 2003.

Killer whales born in captivity
The majority of today's theme-park Orcas were born in captivity: 33 out of 56. Kalina, a female orca born in September 1985 at SeaWorld Orlando, was the first captive orca calf to survive more than two months. Kalina's mother is an Icelandic female named Katina, and her father, Winston (also known as Ramu III), was a Pacific Southern Resident, making Kalina an Atlantic/Pacific hybrid—a unique situation that would not have occurred in the wild.

The first Orca conceived through artificial insemination was male Nakai, who was born to Kasatka and father Tilikum at the SeaWorld park in San Diego in September 2001. A female killer whale named Kohana, the second Orca conceived in this manner, was born at the same park eight months later. Artificial insemination lets park owners maintain a healthier genetic mix in the small groups of orcas at each park while avoiding the stress of moving the animals between marinas.

The practice of exhibiting Orcas born in captivity is less controversial than of retaining free-born orcas, since the captive-born orcas have known no other world and may not be able to adapt to life in the wild. Captive breeding also promises to reduce incentives to capture wild orcas. However, in January 2002 the Miami Seaquarium stated that captive orcas are dying faster than they are being born, and as it is virtually impossible to obtain orcas captured from the wild, the business of exhibiting captive orcas may eventually disappear.

Captivity locations

As of September 29, 2016, orcas in 13 facilities in North and South America, Europe and Asia provide entertainment for theme park visitors. Building the physical infrastructure of the parks requires major capital expenditure, but as the star attractions the orcas are arguably the most valuable and irreplaceable assets.

SeaWorld

SeaWorld is a chain of marine mammal parks in the United States and is the largest owner of captive killer whales in the world. The parks feature killer whale, sea lion, and dolphin shows and zoological displays featuring various other marine animals. The parks' icon is Shamu, the orca. Parks include:
SeaWorld San Diego, San Diego, California; home of Corky II, Orkid, Ulises, Kalia, Ikaika, Keet, Shouka and Makani. Corky II is the oldest killer whale ever kept in human care, estimated to be 56 years old.
SeaWorld Orlando, Orlando, Florida; home of Katina, Trua, Nalani, Malia, and Makai
SeaWorld San Antonio, San Antonio, Texas; home of Kyuquot, Tuar, Takara, Sakari, and Kamea

There was also a fourth park named SeaWorld Ohio, but the park closed in 2001.

Miami Seaquarium

The Miami Seaquarium is an aquarium located on Virginia Key in Biscayne Bay near downtown Miami, Florida. A subsidiary of the privately held Wometco Enterprises, the Seaquarium was the first major marine park attraction in South Florida, opening in 1955. In addition to marine mammals, the Miami Seaquarium houses fish, sharks, sea turtles, birds and reptiles. It is home to Lolita (aka Tokitae).

Marineland Canada

Marineland is the only facility in Canada holding captive whales or dolphins. It is a privately held themed amusement and animal exhibition park in the city of Niagara Falls, Ontario, Canada. Owing to its proximity to the falls and other natural park areas and its blend of animal attractions and rides, it is one of the main tourist destinations in Niagara Falls, in Ontario, Canada. The only orca held there was Kiska. Kiska died of a bacterial infection on March 9, 2023, ending Orca captivity in Canada.

A law banning breeding or keeping cetaceans in captivity (except for rehabilitation or research, and those already held) was passed by the Parliament of Canada in June, 2019. During the debate, the Vancouver Aquarium (the only other Canadian facility holding affected animals at the time) announced it would no longer keep dolphins or whales.

Marineland (Antibes)

Marineland is an animal exhibition park in Antibes, France, founded in 1970. It receives more than 1,200,000 visitors per year, and is the only French sea park featuring two cetacean species: killer whales and dolphins. The park is a subsidiary of Parques Reunidos, a Spanish group with properties in Europe, Argentina and the US. It currently holds Inouk (M), Wikie (F), Moana (M), and Keijo (M) and owns Shouka (F), who is at SeaWorld San Diego.

Loro Parque

Loro Parque (Spanish for "parrot park") is a zoo located on the outskirts of Puerto de la Cruz on Tenerife. The park has the world's largest indoor penguin exhibition, the longest shark tunnel in Europe, and is one of only two parks in Europe to house killer whales.

In February 2006, Loro Parque received four young killer whales; two males, Keto (born in 1995) and Tekoa (born in 2000), and two females, Kohana (2002) and Skyla (2004) on loan from SeaWorld. Sea World has sent its own professionals, including trainers, curators & veterinarians, to supplement the staff at Loro Parque.  In 2004 and 2005, before the killer whales were brought to Loro Parque, eight animal trainers from the park were sent to Sea World parks in Texas and Florida for training. However, only half of these trainers are currently employed in Orca Ocean, Loro Parque's facility for the killer whales. None of the subsequent employees hired have been sent to Sea World parks for training.  On December 24, 2009, orca trainer Alexis Martinez, age 29, was killed during a Christmas show rehearsal when he was attacked by one of the killer whales, resulting in his drowning. He had worked at Loro Parque since 2004. From this date the trainers no longer enter the water with the orcas during live shows. In December 2017, SeaWorld announced that the orcas they loaned to Loro Parque now belonged to the Spanish amusement park.

Female Orca Morgan also lives at Loro Parque.

Mundo Marino

Mundo Marino, located south of Buenos Aires in the coastal town of San Clemente del Tuyú, Argentina, is the largest aquarium in South America. Mundo Marino is home to one male killer whale, Kshamenk, that was stranded, or force-stranded, in 1992. Kshamenk is estimated to have been around  years old when captured.

Port of Nagoya Public Aquarium

Port of Nagoya Public Aquarium is a public aquarium in Minato-ku, Nagoya, Aichi Prefecture, Japan. The Port of Nagoya Public Aquarium is the largest existing public aquarium in Japan. Captivity began with "Kū", followed by "Nami", "Stella", "Bingo", and "Ran", and on November 13, 2012, "Bingo" and "Stella" calves were born. It is currently home to Stella (F) and child Lynn (F) and grandchild Earth (M).

Kamogawa Sea World

Kamogawa Sea World is an aquarium located in Kamogawa city, Chiba Prefecture, Japan. In 1970, the facility first started breeding killer whales in Japan, and in 1998, "Maggie" succeeded in giving birth and received a breeding award from JAZA.
Currently, Lovey (F), Lara (F), Ran (F) and Luna (F) are housed there.

Chimelong Ocean Kingdom

Chimelong Ocean Kingdom is a marine park located in Hengqin, Zhuhai, China. In 2017, the facility opened an orca breeding facility, initially containing five males and four females sourced from Russia. Four of these orcas are named Grace, Nukka, Orpheus, and Tyson.

Other marine exhibitions
 Moskvarium, Moscow, Russia; home of Narnia, Nord, and Juliet
 TINRO Center, Vladivostok, Russia; home of three-four unnamed orcas, one male and two females
 Shanghai Haichang Ocean Park, Shanghai, China
It is unknown where TIN-OO-C1306 currently resides, he/she may be with Chimelong Ocean Kingdom, the TINRO Center, or at another park.

Captivity conditions

Tank size and water conditions
Legal requirements for tank size vary greatly from country to country. In the US, the minimum enclosure size is set by the Code of Federal Regulations, under the Specifications for the Humane Handling, Care, Treatment, and Transportation of Marine Mammals. Each additional killer whale requires a pool with an additional  of volume. 9 CFR 3.104 also requires a minimum of  surface area per killer whale in Table IV (the example with a cylindrical tank  in diameter for two whales provides  of surface area per killer whale). The Alliance of Marine Mammal Parks and Aquariums (AMMPA) goes further, and recommends  for two killer whales. The US exhibitors of captive killer whales belong to the AMMPA, but exhibitors in other countries do not.

The tanks in most marine parks are considerably larger than the minimum sizes required by regulations. However, the Miami Seaquarium  has been criticized for the small size of the tank holding their sole killer whale, Lolita, which is less than two of her body lengths wide at any point. Building a new tank would be costly and there is little prospect of replacing the aging Lolita.

Nutrition and medical care
On average, an adult killer whale in the wild may eat about three to four percent of their body weight daily, or as much as 227 kg (500 lb) of food for a six-ton male. Their diet in the wild depends on what is available, and may include fish, walruses, seals, sea lions, penguins, squid, sea turtles, sharks and whales. According to SeaWorld, each of their adult orcas receives 140 to 240 pounds of food per day, primarily herring, capelin, salmon and mackerel. To maintain their alertness, the killer whales are fed at sporadic intervals throughout the day (as would happen in the wild) and feeding is often combined with training and shows. Each batch of fish is carefully tested to determine its nutritive composition, and each killer whale's weight, activity and health is carefully monitored to determine any special dietary requirements.

Killer whales have been the subject of extensive medical research since their first capture, and much is known about prevention and treatment of the common viral and bacterial infections, including vaccination and use of antibiotics and other medicines. Allometric principles and therapeutic drug monitoring are used to accurately determine the doses and avoid toxicity.

Training
Whales are trained using a system of reward (called "positive reinforcement" by trainers) by giving the killer whale food or other reinforcement when they are successful. If the animals is unsuccessful, it is simply asked again, if again the animal is unsuccessful, it is asked to do a very simple behavior or trick it knows well. Food withdrawal is only used in facilities considered to be improper. Food rewards are often called “least rewarding scenarios” as many whales find fish boring or are simply not hungry. Secondary reinforcement—things not essential to life, such as play time, tactile rewards and fun games—can also be used as rewards.

Issues with captivity
The practice of keeping killer whales in captivity is controversial, and organizations such as World Animal Protection and the Whale and Dolphin Conservation campaign against the captivity of killer whales. Orcas in captivity may develop physical pathologies, such as the dorsal fin collapse seen in 80–90% of captive males.

The captive environment bears little resemblance to their wild habitat, and the social groups that the killer whales are put into are foreign to those found in the wild. Critics claim that captive life is stressful due to small tanks, false social groupings and chemically altered water. Captive killer whales have been observed acting aggressively toward themselves, other killer whales, or humans, which critics say is a result of stress.

Disease and lifespan
The lifespan of killer whales in captivity versus wild killer whales is disputed.  Several studies published in scientific journals show that the average mortality rate for captive killer whales is approximately three times higher than in the wild. A 2015 study in the Journal of Mammalogy, authored by SeaWorld's vice-president of theriogenology, Todd Robeck, concluded that the life expectancy for killer whales born at SeaWorld is the same as those in the wild. In the wild, female killer whales have a typical lifespan of 60–80 years, and a maximum recorded lifespan of 103 years.  The average lifespan for males in the wild is 30 years, but some live up to 50–60 years. The 2015 study has been criticised by Trevor Willis, senior lecturer in marine biology at the University of Portsmouth, who stated that the study is misleading, "clearly wrong" and indicative of "poor practice".  He stated that it is misleading in two ways: "First, it compares two completely different circumstances: the controlled environment of a swimming pool, with highly trained vets on hand; and the wild ocean. "There are no predators in a swimming pool. Second, and in the absence of any other information, it appears they've looked at the survival rate of calves in the first two years of life and extrapolated it out 50 years into the future." He also stated that no captive orca has lived for 55.8 years, the recorded average life expectancy of adult orcas at SeaWorld.

SeaWorld San Antonio's 14-year-old Taku, born in captivity, died suddenly on October 17, 2007. Trainers were notified that Taku had been acting differently a week before his death. The necropsy determined that Taku had died from a sudden case of pneumonia, a common illness among captive orcas. It was also discovered that Taku was infected by the West nile virus, transmitted by mosquitos.

The shallowness of orca tanks forces orcas to spend a lot of time at the surface, where they are exposed to ultraviolet (UV) rays. Sunburns and the development of cataracts in orcas in captivity are attributed to this exposure. Orcas in the wild live at higher latitudes, meaning less intense sun, and spend more time in deeper, darker waters. While the effects of prolonged UV exposure on orcas' skin is uncertain, since captive orca necropsies are extremely secretive, it is thought that prolonged exposure to UV rays on unprotected skin would have the same negative effects such as melanoma (skin cancer) on orcas as it does on humans.

The original Namu developed a bacterial infection which damaged his nervous system, causing him to become unresponsive to people. During his illness he charged full-speed into the wire mesh of his pen, thrashed violently for a few minutes and then died.

Dorsal fin collapse

Most captive male killer whales, and some females, have a dorsal fin that is partially or completely collapsed to one side. Several hypotheses exist as to why this happens. A dorsal fin is held erect by collagen, which normally hardens in late adolescence.

Scientists from the National Marine Fisheries Service (NMFS) have reported that "the collapsed dorsal fins commonly seen in captive killer whales do not result from a pathogenic condition, but are instead thought to most likely originate from an irreversible structural change in the fin's collagen over time. Possible explanations for this include: (1) alterations in water balance caused by the stresses of captivity dietary changes, (2) lowered blood pressure due to reduced activity patterns, or (3) overheating of the collagen brought on by greater exposure of the fin to the ambient air." According to SeaWorld's website, another reason for the fin to bend may be the greater amount of time that captive whales spend at the surface, where the fin is not supported by water pressure. The Whale and Dolphin Conservation says that dorsal fin collapse is largely explained by captive killer whales swimming in small circles due to the inadequate space in which they have to swim.

Collapsed or collapsing dorsal fins are rare in most wild populations and usually result from a serious injury to the fin, such as from being shot or colliding with a vessel. After exposure to the 1989 Exxon Valdez oil spill, two male resident killer whales experienced dorsal fin collapse, and the animals subsequently died. In 2002, the dorsal fin of a stranded killer whale showed signs of collapse after three days but regained its natural upright appearance as soon as the orca resumed strong normal swimming upon release.

A study in 1998 recorded that 7 out of 30 (23%) adult male killer whales off the coast of New Zealand had abnormal dorsal fins. Fins were considered abnormal if they displayed collapse, partial collapse, or bends. This is a higher prevalence of these deformities than in other areas of the world, as studies have reported rates of abnormal fins in wild adult males at 4.7% in British Columbia and 0.57% in Norway. Researchers in 1994 found that of the ~300 killer whales photographed off the coast of British Columbia, fewer than 1% were observed to have "droopy" dorsal fins.

Attacks on humans

ABC News reported that captive killer whales have attacked nearly two dozen people since the 1970s. Studies of killer whales in the wild have identified at least two categories, based on their territorial range. Those living in a limited area, such as Puget Sound or the Strait of Juan de Fuca, are termed "resident" whales, while "transient" whales roam the oceans at will. These "transient" types have to be more aggressive, in order to assert themselves in a wide range of territories and to prey on a variety of different species. This increased aggressiveness does not disappear in captivity. Furthermore, captivity itself has been asserted to aggravate aggressive behavior, resulting in a "cetacean equivalent of anxiety disorder".

Captive killer whale attacks on humans fall mostly into the categories of biting during feeding, ramming in the water, and holding under water. Killer whales biting trainers during feeding or shows is generally the mildest form of attack seen, but can escalate to an animal dragging the trainer underwater and holding them there until they lose consciousness or drown. Trainers who have had killer whales ram into them in the water have suffered from injuries including internal bleeding, broken bones, ruptured organs, and heart attack.

Tilikum, a large bull male killer whale who died in early 2017, was involved in the death of three individuals since his capture near Iceland in November 1983.  In 1991, Tilikum and two other killer whales grabbed 20-year-old trainer Keltie Byrne in their mouths and tossed her to each other, drowning Byrne. On July 5, 1999, Daniel P. Dukes visited SeaWorld and stayed after the park closed, evading security so as to enter a killer whale tank.  He was found dead the next day, floating in Tilikum's pool.  He died due to a combination of hypothermia, trauma, and drowning but Dukes was covered in bruises, abrasions and bite marks, and his scrotum had been ripped open, indicating that Tilikum had toyed with the victim.  It is unclear whether Tilikum actually caused the man's death. On February 24, 2010, after a noontime performance at Sea World, Orlando, Florida, Tilikum killed trainer Dawn Brancheau during a training session with the whale.  This latest incident with Tilikum reawakened a heated discussion about the effect of captivity on the killer whale's behavior.  In May 2012, Occupational Safety and Health Administration administrative law judge Ken Welsch faulted SeaWorld for the death of Dawn Brancheau and introduced regulations requiring a physical barrier between trainers and killer whales.

Kasatka, a female killer whale who was captured off the coast of Iceland in October 1978 at the age of one year, has shown aggression toward humans. Kasatka tried to bite a trainer during a show in 1993, and again in 1999. On November 30, 2006, Kasatka grabbed a trainer and dragged him underwater during their show. The trainer suffered puncture wounds to both feet and a torn metatarsal ligament in his left foot.

On Christmas Eve of 2009, 29-year-old Alexis Martínez of Loro Parque, Tenerife, Spain, was killed by a whale named Keto. After spending two and a half minutes at the bottom of the 12-meter-deep main pool, his body was retrieved but he could not be revived. The park initially characterized the death as an accident and claimed that the body showed no signs of violence, but the subsequent autopsy report stated that Martinez died due to grave injuries sustained by an orca attack, including multiple compression fractures, tears to vital organs, and the bite marks of the animal on his body. During the investigation into Martinez's death, it came to light that the park had also misrepresented a 2007 incident with Tekoa, the other male, claiming that it was an accident rather than an attack.

The only recorded injury of a human by an orca in the wild happened in 1972 at Point Sur, California.

Aggression between captive orcas
In August 1989, the dominant female Icelandic killer whale at SeaWorld San Diego, Kandu V, attempted to "rake" a female newcomer named Corky. Raking is a way orcas show dominance by forcefully scratching at another with their teeth (however, raking can also be a way of communication or play between whales, and it is witnessed in the wild). Kandu charged at Corky, attempting to rake her, missed, and continued her charge into the back pool, where she ended up ramming the wall, rupturing an artery in her jaw. The crowd was quickly ushered out of the stadium. Forty-five minutes later Kandu V sank to the bottom of the pool and died.

Kanduke, a male captured from T pod in British Columbia, Canada, in August 1975, often fought with a younger Icelandic male named Kotar. The aggression became increasingly serious, leading to an incident in which Kotar bit a part of Kanduke's genitals and caused an infection. It is not known if such serious aggression and injury would occur in the open seas.

Early pregnancy and related issues
Captive killer whales often give birth at a much younger age than in the wild, sometimes as young as age seven. The young mothers may have difficulty raising their offspring. The calves have a relatively low survival rate, though some have lived into adulthood.

Corky (II), a female from the A5 Pod in British Columbia, Canada became the first killer whale to become pregnant in captivity, giving birth on February 28, 1977. The calf died after 18 days. Corky went on to give birth six more times, but the longest surviving calf, Kiva, lived only 47 days. SeaWorld has attracted criticism over its continued captivity of Corky II from the Born Free Foundation, which wants her returned to the wild.

A killer whale named Katina, captured near Iceland at about three years of age in October 1978, became pregnant in early spring of 1984 at SeaWorld San Diego and gave birth in September 1985 to a female named Kalina. Although ten years was an extremely young age for a killer whale to become a mother, Kalina was the first killer whale calf to be successfully born and raised in captivity. In turn, Kalina gave birth at only seven and a half years of age to her first calf, a male named Keet.

Gudrun was an Icelandic female caught in the 1970s. In 1993, she gave birth to Nyar, a female who was both mentally and physically ill, and who Gudrun tried to drown during several shows. Nyar died from an illness a few months later. Gudrun died in 1996 from stillbirth complications.

Taima is a transient/Icelandic hybrid female killer whale born in captivity to Gudrun in 1989. Trainers believe that Gudrun's behavior towards Nyar may have confused Taima, as she may have learned by example that this was how to raise a calf. In May 1998, Taima gave birth to a male calf named Sumar. They were separated when he was about eight months old because of the aggression between them. On one occasion while performing, Taima started biting Sumar and throwing him out of the pool onto the trainer's platform. She then slid out herself, and continued to bite him. In November 2000, Taima gave birth to a male named Tekoa. The two were separated after only nine months due to aggression between them. On March 12, 2007, Taima gave birth to her third calf, Malia. Taima seemed to be a better mother this time, and no notable occurrences of aggression were reported; this may be in part due to the fact that Kalina acted as "aunt" to Malia and helped Taima to look after her. Kalina was a very experienced mother and was often kept with Malia, while Taima was given time with her mate, Tilikum.
Taima died in 2010 during the birthing process of her fourth calf.  The calf, fathered by Tilikum, was stillborn.

Kayla, a killer whale born in captivity, gave birth to her first calf on October 9, 2005, a female named Halyn. Kayla rejected her calf, perhaps because she had never been exposed to a young calf before and did not know how to deal with it. Halyn was moved to a special animal care facility to be hand raised. Halyn died unexpectedly on June 15, 2008.

On October 13, 2010, Kohana, an eight-year-old female killer whale, gave birth to a male calf at Loro Parque's "Orca Ocean" exhibit after a four-hour labor. The calf weighed about 150 kilograms (330 lb), and was two meters (6 ft 7 in) long. Kohana has yet to establish a "maternal bond" with her calf, forcing trainers to take the first steps in hand rearing him. The outcome of this pregnancy was not considered surprising, since Kohana was separated from her own mother, Takara, at three years of age, and was never able to learn about maternal care, compounded by the fact that she spent the formative years of her life surrounded by the three other juvenile killer whales at Loro Parque.

See also
List of captive orcas
List of individual cetaceans

References

External links
Further reading Selected bibliography on Orcas from NOAA.

Orcas

Animals in captivity
Animal rights